Firies ( officially Firies) is a village in County Kerry, Ireland in the barony of Magunihy. It is situated midway between the hub towns of Killarney (14.5 km), Tralee (16 km), Castleisland (16 km) and Killorglin (13 km). It is on the R561 road between Farranfore and Castlemaine. The population at the 2016 census was 558. There are two principal rivers, namely the Maine and its chief tributary, the Brown Flesk.

Education
In 1991, Firies National School moved to a new location beside the church. It is a rural 16 teacher school with 5 special needs assistants. There are currently 273 pupils enrolled. It is actively involved in the Green Schools Initiative, Discovery Science and the Aistear Programmes.

Firies Castle
On a rock outcrop 855 meters south of the village is the fragmentary remains of a rectangular tower.  The ground-floor appears to be occupied by a single chamber which was covered by a rounded vault which is almost entirely fallen.  Only part of the walling above ground-floor level survives.

Firies Castle was built by the O’Connors. It is in the townland of Firies, in the parish of Firies, in the barony of Magunihy and in the county of Kerry. It was built in the thirteenth century and it was knocked in the sixteenth century. It was a very small castle. It is in a ruin with over two hundred years. Numerous woods flourished for miles around it.  It is from these woods that Firies got its name.

Notable people
Bishop Eamonn Casey, Irish clergyman.

See also
 List of towns and villages in Ireland

References

External links

Towns and villages in County Kerry